Delmar Wesley Crandall (March 5, 1930May 5, 2021) was an American professional baseball player and manager. He was born in Ontario, California. Crandall played as a catcher in Major League Baseball and spent most of his career with the Boston / Milwaukee Braves. He led the league in assists a record-tying six times, in fielding percentage four times and in putouts three times. Crandall was the last living player to have played for the Boston Braves.

Early life
Crandall was born in Ontario, California, on March 5, 1930.  He was the second of three children of Richard and Nancy Crandall, who were both employed in the citrus-packaging industry.  He was raised in Fullerton and attended Fullerton Union High School.  Crandall  played catcher for the school team and for the local American Legion Baseball team.  He was signed as an amateur free agent by the Boston Braves before the 1948 season.

Professional career

Playing career (1949–1966)
Crandall played less than two seasons in the minor leagues from 1948 to 1949.  He made his MLB debut on June 17, 1949, at the age of 19, entering as a pinch runner in the final inning of a 7–2 loss to the Cincinnati Reds.  Crandall appeared in 146 games for Boston in 1949-1950, before entering military service during the Korean War. When his two-year hitch was over in March 1953, the Braves departed Boston for Milwaukee, where they benefited from an offense featuring Hank Aaron, Eddie Mathews and Joe Adcock. Crandall seized the regular catcher's job from Walker Cooper in 1953 and held it for eight years, handling Braves pitchers such as left-hander Warren Spahn and right-handers Lew Burdette and Bob Buhl. From 1953 to 1959, the Braves' pitching staff finished either first or second in the National League in team earned run average every year except 1955. Burdette credited Crandall for some of his success, saying, "I never- well hardly ever- have to shake him off. He knows the job like no one else, and you can have faith in his judgment". On September 11, 1955, with the Braves trailing the Philadelphia Phillies 4-1 with two outs and a 3-2 count in the ninth inning, Crandall hit a grand slam home run to win the game. The Braves won National League pennants in 1957 and 1958, also finishing in second place five times between 1953 and 1960, and captured the 1957 World Series championship – the franchise's first title since 1914. Although he batted .211 in the 1957 Series against the New York Yankees, Crandall had a solo home run for the Braves' last tally in a 5-0 win in the deciding Game 7.

Though rarely among the league leaders in offensive categories, he finished 10th in the 1958 Most Valuable Player Award voting after hitting .272, tying his best mark to that point, with career highs in doubles and walks; Crandall also led the league in putouts, assists and fielding average, and won his first Gold Glove. In the 1958 World Series, again against the Yankees, he hit .240; he slugged another Game 7 solo home run, tying the score 2-2 in the sixth inning, though the Yankees went on to score four more runs to win the game and the Series.

Crandall averaged 125 games caught during the peak of his career, but missed most of the 1961 season due to shoulder trouble, which gave Joe Torre his opportunity to break in. While Crandall did come back to catch 90 games in 1962 — hitting a career-high .297, making his final National League All-Star squad and winning his last Gold Glove — he was soon replaced by Torre as the Braves' regular catcher. In 1962, Crandall also moved ahead of Roy Campanella, setting the National League record for career fielding percentage; however, Johnny Roseboro would edge ahead of him before his career ended. After 1963, Crandall was traded by the Braves to the San Francisco Giants in a seven-player deal; he played a backup role in his final three major league seasons with the Giants (1964), Pittsburgh Pirates (1965), and Cleveland Indians (1966).

Career statistics
In 1,573 games over 16 seasons, Crandall finished with a batting average of .254 with 179 home runs; his 175 HRs in the National League trailed only Campanella (242), Gabby Hartnett (236) and Ernie Lombardi (190) among the league's catchers. His 1,430 games caught in the National League trailed only Al López, Hartnett and Lombardi. Crandall won four of the first five Gold Glove Awards given to a National League catcher, and tied another record by catching three no-hitters. He retired with the fourth most home runs by a National League catcher, and his career .404 slugging average also placed him among the league's top ten receivers. Crandall ended his career among the major league career leaders in putouts (4th, 7352), total chances (8th, 8200) and fielding percentage (5th, .989) behind the plate, and ranked fourth in National League history in games caught. Crandall was a superb defensive player with a strong arm; he threw out 45.44% of the base runners who tried to steal a base on him, ranking him 8th on the all-time list. He was selected as an All-Star eight times during his career: 1953–1956, 1958–1960, 1962. A powerful right-handed hitter, Crandall topped the 20 home run mark three times. After having caught Jim Wilson's no-hitter on June 12, 1954, he added another pair in 1960 — by Burdette on August 18, and by Spahn a month later on September 16; all three were against the Philadelphia Phillies. Richard Kendall of the Society for American Baseball Research devised an unscientific study that ranked Crandall as the fourth most dominating fielding catcher in major league history.
The youngest battery to play in the Major Leagues was the Boston Braves battery of Del Crandell catching and Johnny Antonnelli pitching, both were 19 years old at the time.
Crandell's first Major League game with the Boston Braves was attended by his mother and father who traveled from CA to Boston only to see their son get ejected from the game for arguing with an umpire.

Crandall and pitcher Warren Spahn started 316 games as a battery, which was passed by Mickey Lolich and Bill Freehan (who pitched together from 1963 to 1975). Currently. The Spahn-Crandall battery currently ranks as the third best in games played together of any such duo since 1900.

Managing and broadcasting career (1972–1997)
Crandall eventually turned to managing, and piloted two American League clubs, the Milwaukee Brewers (1972–75) and the Seattle Mariners (1983–84). In each case he was hired to try to right a losing team in mid-season, but he never enjoyed a winning campaign with either team and finished with a managing record of 364–469 (.437). In between those American League stints, he was a highly successful manager of the Los Angeles Dodgers' top farm club, the Albuquerque Dukes of the Triple-A Pacific Coast League, and also managed the Class A San Bernardino Stampede from 1995 to 1997. He remained in the Dodger organization as a special catching instructor well into his 60s. He also worked as a sports announcer with the Chicago White Sox radio team from 1985 through 1988 and with the Brewers from 1992 to 1994. From August 2020 until his death, Crandall was the last living Boston Brave, following the death of Bert Thiel on July 31.

Personal life
Crandall married Frances Sorrells in 1951, one day before he reported for military service.  Together, they had six children who survived him: Lynn (McAlpine), Del Jr., Jeff, Bob, Tim, and Bill, in addition to Ronnie, who died when he was 7 years old from complications of cerebral palsy.  The family relocated to Brookfield, Wisconsin, in 1959. Crandall died on May 5, 2021, at his home in Mission Viejo, California.  He was 91, and had Parkinson’s disease, heart disease, and suffered several strokes prior to his death.

References

External links

 Baseball-Reference.com — career managing record
Del Crandall Oral History Interview (1 of 3) — National Baseball Hall of Fame Digital Collection 
Del Crandall Oral History Interview (2 of 3) — National Baseball Hall of Fame Digital Collection 
Del Crandall Oral History Interview (3 of 3) — National Baseball Hall of Fame Digital Collection 

1930 births
2021 deaths
Albuquerque Dodgers players
American expatriate baseball people in the Dominican Republic
American military personnel of the Korean War
Baseball players from California
Boston Braves players
California Angels coaches
Caribbean Series managers
Chicago White Sox announcers
Cleveland Indians players
Deaths from Parkinson's disease
Evansville Braves players
Gold Glove Award winners
Major League Baseball broadcasters
Major League Baseball catchers
Military personnel from California
Milwaukee Braves players
Milwaukee Brewers announcers
Milwaukee Brewers managers
Milwaukee Brewers (minor league) players
Minor league baseball managers
National League All-Stars
People from Ontario, California
Pittsburgh Pirates players
San Francisco Giants players
Seattle Mariners managers